Canarana tuberculicollis is a species of beetle in the family Cerambycidae. It was described by Félix Édouard Guérin-Méneville in 1855. It is known from Ecuador, Brazil and Peru.

References

tubericulicollis
Beetles described in 1855